Edward Francis Hock (March 27, 1899 in Franklin Furnace, Ohio, - November 11, 1963 in Portsmouth, Ohio) was an American Major League Baseball player who played parts of three seasons for the St. Louis Cardinals and the Cincinnati Reds from 1920 to 1924. He had just one major league hit, but 3,474 in the minor leagues.

References

External links

1899 births
1963 deaths
Ashland Colonels players
Atlanta Crackers players
Baseball players from Ohio
Cincinnati Reds players
Dallas Steers players
Gladewater Bears players
Houston Buffaloes players
Logan Indians players
St. Louis Cardinals players
Major League Baseball outfielders
Minor league baseball managers
Monroe Twins players
New Orleans Pelicans (baseball) players
Newark Bears (IL) players
Oklahoma City Indians players
Richmond Colts players
Shreveport Sports players
Texarkana Liners players
People from Scioto County, Ohio